Epipactis distans is a species of orchid.

References

distans